U godini is the fifteenth studio album by Serbian singer Dragana Mirković and a collaborative album with Zlaja Band. It was released in 1999.

Track listing
U godini (In the year)
Koliko je prevarenih (How many are deceived)
Danima (By days)
Bilo čija (Anyone)
Otrov i melem (Poison and balm)
Ostavljeni (Left)
Da li znaš (Do you know)
Nema te nema (You're gone)
Još si meni drag (I still like you)
Nema vatre (There's no fire)
Kada te ugledam (When I look at you)
Bog zna (God knows)
Plače mi se (I want to cry)

References

1999 albums
Dragana Mirković albums
Grand Production albums